Chloealtis conspersa, known generally as sprinkled grasshopper, is a species of slant-faced grasshopper in the family Acrididae. Other common names include the sprinkled locust and sprinkled broad-winged grasshopper. It is found in North America.

References

Further reading

 

Gomphocerinae
Articles created by Qbugbot
Insects described in 1841